Toro Dingo, also registered as Dingo Mini Diggers Pty Ltd, is an Australian manufacturing company based in Dalby, Queensland. They are the manufacturers of the Dingo Mini Digger which was previously known as the Dingo Mini Loader.

History 
The TORO Dingo Mini Digger is a type of mini 'skid-steer loader', an easily maneuvered machine which can typically carry and load dirt, dig trenches, dig post holes and operate a range of attachments. The Dingo has a platform at the back on which the operator stands to operate the machine.

The original Dingo Mini Loader was invented by Ken Whiffin, who was a builder on the Gold Coast of Queensland, Australia. He was assisted by his son, Peter Whiffin, who registered a trading name "Riga'l Universal Loaders" for ownership of the patent associated with the machines. Jaden Engineering were contracted to build the early models. In the 1980s, Riga'L Universal Loaders trademarked the Dingo name for the product.

In 1994, Wendell Williams bought the rights to the Dingo machine and, in 1995, established Williams Inc and started to work to import the manufactured products to America to sell, transforming it with a more powerful engine and more hydraulic power. Today, the machine is available in several models and with a wide range of attachments.

In 1995, the Dingo product was introduced to the United States by Wendell Williams . In 1997, the manufacturing rights for the North and South American markets were sold to Toro. Toro continues to use the Dingo name for their "Compact Utility Loader" and small earthmover.

Models

Dingo 600 (1992) 

 Historical / service parts to be added

Dingo 950 (1995) 

 Historical / service parts to be added

K9-3 (2002) 
Service parts

 Replacement battery: Bosch 40B19LS. Bosch part number 0092S37010 - (S stands for 'SAE' standard size terminal) - 226mm (h) including terminal x 127mm (l) x 226mm (w). The Dingo battery tray is specifically designed for the following size: ~200mm (h) x ~180mm (l) x ~125mm (w) at the base of the battery. Other Australian battery manufacturers such as SuperCharge (SMFNS40ZALX) and Century (NS40ZLS MF) will no longer fit the Dingo K9-3, as the length of these cells are now 196 mm in length as of ~ 2013. 
 Hydraulic filter: 330-004-020
 Hydraulic oil: Valvoline ISO HVI168 - Specifically need this HV (High Viscosity) variant.  
 Engine service parts such as oil filter, fuel filter, air filter and spark plugs are best determined using the engine number. The standard engine for this model is a Kohler unit, however these engines have been known to be replaced by users with Honda or Briggs and Stratton units with similar displacements, so it's best to cross check the correct part numbers using the engine number / removing the parts and matching at your local Dingo parts distributor / small engine specialist.

K9-4 (2002 ~ 2016) 

 Historical / service parts to be added

Ozzy Wacker Neuson series - (2017 ~ Present) 

 Historical / service parts to be added

SM275-19W

SM325-24W

SM325-27W

SM440-31W

SM275-19T

SM325-24T

SM325-27T

SM440-31T

Awards 
2005 Queensland Training Awards: Mining Industry Skills Centre Medium Employer of the Year & Resources and Infrastructure Industry Skills Council Award

See also 
 Kanga Loaders

References

External links

Australian brands
Manufacturing companies established in 1992
Companies based in Queensland
Construction equipment manufacturers of Australia
Australian companies established in 1992